Muhammad Umar Memon (Urdu: محمد عمر میمن) Professor Emeritus of Urdu Literature and Arabic Studies, (University of Wisconsin–Madison), Memon was an accomplished scholar, translator, Urdu Short Story writer, and the editor of The Annual of Urdu Studies.

Memon retired from the University of Wisconsin after 38 years of service but remained active as a scholar: besides working on translation of Urdu works into English, he served on the editorial board of Pakistaniaat: A Journal of Pakistan Studies and was also an advisor to the Urdu Project.

Biography 
Memon was born in Aligarh, India in 1939. In 1954, his family moved to Karachi, Pakistan where he earned his bachelor's and master's degrees. After his graduation, he taught at Sachal Sarmast College and Sind University. In 1964 he won a Fulbright scholarship to the United States. This move enabled him to earn a master's degree from Harvard University and eventually a doctorate in Islamic Studies from UCLA. Memon joined the University of Wisconsin-Madison in 1970 and retired from there after 38 years of service. At UW he taught Urdu, Islamic Studies as well courses in Arabic and Persian.

Scholarly and creative work 
While a complete list of his scholarly and creative works can be found on his website, some major works are listed below:

Studies in the Urdu Gazal and Prose Fiction. Madison: University of Wisconsin press, 1979.

English translations of many of Naiyer Masud's Urdu short stories, including the volumes Essence of Camphor and The Snake Catcher

References

External links 
 The Annual of Urdu Studies

Pakistani educational theorists
Pakistani literary critics
People from Aligarh
1939 births
2018 deaths
Harvard University alumni
Memon people
Academic staff of the University of Sindh